Liza Rebecca Weil (born June 5, 1977) is an American actress. She is best known for her starring role as Paris Geller in the WB/CW comedy-drama series Gilmore Girls (2000–2007) and its Netflix revival series Gilmore Girls: A Year in the Life (2016). She is also known for her roles as White House aide Amanda Tanner in the ABC political drama series Scandal (2012) and as attorney Bonnie Winterbottom in the ABC legal drama series How to Get Away with Murder (2014–2020).

Early life and training
Weil was born in Passaic, New Jersey, into an acting family. She was raised in, and continues to practice, Reform Judaism.

Her parents, Lisa and Marc Weil, toured Europe with their comedy troupe, The Madhouse Company of London, with her in tow. Weil had aspirations of becoming an archaeologist in her younger years, because of the Indiana Jones film trilogy and a childhood crush on Harrison Ford. In 1984, at the age of seven, her family settled down in suburban Lansdale, Pennsylvania northwest of Philadelphia, where her parents still reside. Weil has described herself as an average student who focused more on her budding acting career than her studies.

Weil traveled frequently to New York City for professional auditions and acted in productions both off-Broadway and in Philadelphia's theatrical community before pursuing her film and television career. A 1995 graduate of North Penn High School, she graduated in the summer rather than the regular term due to her acting commitments. Her first appearance on network television was in a 1995 episode of the New York-based CBS soap opera As the World Turns, where she played an unnamed student in a science class.

Career
Weil continues to be active in the Los Angeles theatrical community during hiatuses, is a regular performer at the Ojai Playwrights Conference in early August and radio dramas with L.A. Theatre Works, and still occasionally performs in live theater in Philadelphia and New York City. She has acted with every member of her family; in 2004, she headlined with her father in a well-received community theater production of Proof at the Montgomery Theater in Souderton, Pennsylvania, just north of her adopted hometown of Lansdale. Her first ever television role in 1994, which was an episode of The Adventures of Pete & Pete called "Yellow Fever", found her playing a bully alongside her mother Lisa, who played a teacher (she would also play a second role later in the series as a love interest to Big Pete in the episode "35 Hours"). Her younger sister Samantha shared the screen with Liza in Gilmore Girls''' third-season finale, "Those Are Strings, Pinocchio". Samantha Weil played a student named Bernadette (who was unrelated to Paris) making a video yearbook entry in front of an impatient Paris, who is standing off to the side waiting to make her own entry.

An alumna of Columbia University, Weil received her first major feature film role co-starring with Kevin Bacon in Stir of Echoes. Before that role, she starred in the 1998 independent film, Whatever. Her first film was the 1996 short film, A Cure For Serpents, where she played a daughter of a mysophobic woman bringing home a boyfriend who was not as obsessive with cleanliness. She also appeared in several other short and feature-length independent films, such as Motel Jerusalem, Scar, and Lullaby. After her work in Whatever and Stir of Echoes, Warner Bros. signed Weil to a talent holding deal and she moved to Los Angeles, where she guest-starred on series produced by that studio, including ER and The West Wing, before being cast on Gilmore Girls.

Weil was originally considered for the role of Rory Gilmore by Gilmore Girls creator Amy Sherman-Palladino before Alexis Bledel won the role; the character of Paris Geller was created especially for Weil.

In 2006, Weil was featured in the horror themed short film, Grace, in which her character suffers a miscarriage, yet decides to carry the baby to term with terrifying results. The film, which also featured Brian Austin Green, premiered at the Fangoria Weekend of Horrors convention on June 2, 2006, and is the basis for the 2009 feature film of the same name. She also had a minor role as a humane society worker in the Molly Shannon film Year of the Dog, and appeared as Doris Delay in the 2008 biographical film Neal Cassady, and as a reporter in the 2010 live-action rotoscoping film Mars.

Weil also voiced a public service announcement in support of the American Diabetes Association's Step Up to Fight Diabetes staircase climb event, which took place in Center City Philadelphia on October 20, 2007.

In 2009, Weil returned to her roots as a regular guest star in various television series, including appearances in Eleventh Hour, CSI, In Plain Sight, Grey's Anatomy and Private Practice and in February 2010 began a run as Dr. Glass on the popular Internet series Anyone But Me; series creator Susan Miller officiated at Weil's wedding to Paul Adelstein in 2006.

In March 2011, Weil was cast as Amanda Tanner, a White House aide, in ABC's Scandal, a series written and produced by Shonda Rhimes. Weil had a recurring role in the series' first season.

Weil played a supporting role in the horror film Smiley, and started 2013 as a recurring guest star in the last half of the only season of Amy Sherman-Palladino's ABC Family series Bunheads as Milly, the sister of Truly Stone. 

She is also a frequent collaborator of independent film director Noah Buschel, having appeared in most of his work. She co-produced and starred in his 2014 low-budget project The Situation is Liquid.

In February 2014, Weil was cast as Bonnie Winterbottom, an assistant to Annalise Keating (Viola Davis) in the ABC series How to Get Away with Murder, which premiered during the 2014–15 television season. She also reprised her role as Paris Geller in the "Winter" and "Spring" episodes of the Netflix revival series Gilmore Girls: A Year in the Life. 

In 2019, it was revealed that Weil would appear in the third season of the Amazon Prime Video series The Marvelous Mrs. Maisel as Carole Keen (a character created in tribute to bass guitarist Carol Kaye, though Kaye voiced objections to the overall character and portrayal), making that series Weil's third collaboration with the Palladinos.

In early 2022, she began recurring as FBI agent Katherine Russo in the Fox series The Cleaning Lady.

Personal life
Weil married actor Paul Adelstein in a Reform Jewish ceremony in November 2006. They had previously known each other through theatrical projects. The two went on to appear together in three film projects: the short film Order Up (2007), the Gregory Dark-helmed Little Fish, Strange Pond (2008), and The Missing Person (2008). She also appeared in a 2011 episode of Private Practice, although she and Adelstein had no scenes together. In April 2010, the couple had a daughter, Josephine Elizabeth Weil-Adelstein. Weil filed for divorce from Adelstein in March 2016, citing irreconcilable differences. The divorce was finalized in November 2017. 

Weil dated her Murder'' co-star Charlie Weber from mid-2016 to February 2019.

Weil is left-handed and a natural brunette. Her niece is child actress Scarlett Estevez.

Filmography

Film

Television

References

External links

 
 

1977 births
20th-century American actresses
21st-century American actresses
Actresses from New Jersey
Actresses from Pennsylvania
American child actresses
American film actresses
American television actresses
American Reform Jews
Columbia College (New York) alumni
Columbia University alumni
Jewish American actresses
Living people
People from Montgomery County, Pennsylvania
People from Passaic, New Jersey
People from Lansdale, Pennsylvania
People from Passaic County, New Jersey
21st-century American Jews